The Nemenjiche River is a tributary of Obatogamau Lakes, flowing into the Regional County Municipality (RCM) of Eeyou Istchee Baie-James, into the administrative region of Nord-du-Québec, in the province of Quebec, in Canada. The course of the river crosses the townships of Robert, Rohault, Gamache and Dauversière.

The Eastern side of the Nemenjiche River hydrographic slope is accessible by a forest road (North-South direction) that separates from route 113 which links Lebel-sur-Quévillon to Chibougamau. The West side is served by the R1032 road that goes North to the South of Lake Fancamp.

The surface of the Nemenjiche River is usually frozen from early November to mid-May, however, safe ice circulation is generally from mid-November to mid-April.

Geography

Toponymy 
The toponym "Rivière Nemenjiche" was formalized on December 5, 1968, at the Commission de toponymie du Québec, i.e. at the creation of this commission.

References

See also 

Rivers of Nord-du-Québec
Nottaway River drainage basin
Eeyou Istchee James Bay